Al-Sultan Muhammad Audha Kalaminjaa Siri Areedha Suvara Mahaa Radun (Dhivehi: އައްސުލްޠާން މުޙައްމަދު އައުދަ ކަލަމިންޖާ ސިރީ އަރީދަ ސުވަރަ މަހާރަދުން) was the son of Sultan Wadi Kalaminjaa. He was the Sultan of Maldives from 1269 to 1278.

1278 deaths
13th-century sultans of the Maldives
Year of birth unknown